The Militaire Luchtvaart Museum was located at Camp Zeist near the former Soesterberg Air Base. It was the official museum of the Royal Netherlands Air Force.

In 2006 the Ministry of Defence decided to merge three military museums in the Netherlands into the Nationaal Militair Museum, located at the former Soesterberg Air Base. The new museum opened in 2013.

Collection
 Auster Mark III
 Bölkow Bo-105CB
 Breguet Br.1150 Atlantique
 Cessna T-37 Tweet (In storage at Soesterberg AB)
 Convair F-102A Delta Dagger
 Dornier Do 24K
 Douglas C-47 Dakota "Skytrain"
 Fokker D.VII
 Fokker D.XXI
 Fokker G.1A
 Fokker S.11 "Instructor"
 Fokker S.14 "Machtrainer"
 Fokker F27-300M Troopship
 General Dynamics F-16A
 Gloster Meteor Mk.4
 Grumman S-2A Tracker
 de Havilland DH-82 Tiger Moth
 de Havilland Dominie DH-89B
 de Havilland Canada DHC-2 Beaver
 Hawker Hunter F.Mk.4
 Hawker Sea Fury F.B.51
 Hawker Sea Hawk FGA.50
 Hiller OH-23C Raven
 Koolhoven FK.51
 Lockheed T-33A
 Lockheed 12A
 Lockheed Neptune SP 2H
 Lockheed F-104G Starfighter
 McDonnell Douglas F-4E Phantom II-34-MC s/n 67-0275,c/n 3011 (In storage at Soesterberg AB)
 McDonnell Douglas F-15A
 Mikoyan MiG-21PFM
 Northrop NF-5B
 North American P-51 Mustang
 North American B-25J Mitchell
 North American Harvard AT16
 North American F-100D Super Sabre
 North American F-86K Sabre
 Piper Super Cub L18C
 Republic F-84G Thunderjet
 Republic F-84F Thunderstreak
 Republic RF-84F Thunderflash
 Sikorsky S-58
 Sud Aviation Alouette II
 Sud Aviation Alouette III
 Sud Aviation Alouette III (SAR)
 Supermarine Spitfire LF.Mk.IX.C.

See also
List of aerospace museums

External links

  (in Dutch)

Military and war museums in the Netherlands
Aerospace museums in the Netherlands
Air force museums
Museums in Utrecht (province)
Zeist